Dashiba Station is a station on Line 5 of Chongqing Rail Transit in Chongqing municipality, China, which is located in Jiangbei District and opened in 2018.
Currently, due to the fact that the Central Section of Line 5 (Dashiba-Shiqiaopu) is still under construction, all trains of the North Section terminate here.

Station structure

References

Railway stations in Chongqing
Railway stations in China opened in 2018
Chongqing Rail Transit stations